Wremja was an Estonian situational comedy showing the lives of lower class people. It featured campy humor, intentionally, so as to keep the budget low. Wremja was preceded by the Wigla Show featuring a similar style, and the name was later changed to "Sipelga 14", as a reference to the Estonian soap opera "Õnne 13".

Characters 
Uuno Nisu (Nisu-Unn) (Dan Põldroos) is an alcoholic World War II veteran who fought for Germany and burned Hitler's corpse while drunk in 1945. Has a trademark red coat and ugly moustache. He will drink anything with alcohol in it, including cologne and perfume.

Zorro (Jaan Zorro) (Jan Uuspõld) is Uuno's roommate (after kicking out Uno's family). He is a devoted communist who worked as a torturer, spy and astronaut for the Soviet government. He wears a beret and two pairs of glasses.

Haista Gäng (Dan Põldroos) is a severely alcoholic 30-year old son of Uno. He always wears a worn-out wifebeater and boxers. 

Laar (Mart Laar) (Meelis Adamson) is a women's hairdresser and a friend of Zorro and Uno. He is very peaceful, to the point of being a sissy, but also very interested in Nazism. He is constantly harassed by his mother-in-law.

Ämm / The Mother-in-Law (Maali) (Dan Põldroos) is a sadistic old lady who, after coming to live with her daughter, Maie, harasses Laars. She almost always wants sex, and she constantly eats soup from a bowl.

Rullnokad Pets ja Aiku (Peeter Kelk and Aivar Sõnajalg) (Jan Uuspõld and Dan Põldroos) are local youngsters working in the car scrapyard. They're not very bright, and they love visiting the local nightclubs with their girlfriends.

Dr. Liiv (Anti Liiv) (Martin Padar) is a prominent psychiatrist and the village elder of Haabersti. Though professionally talented, he is extremely corrupt and likes going to bordellos and drinking moonshine with Zorro, Uno and Laar.

Koomik Eints / Eints the Comedian (Eino Baskin) (Dan Põldroos) is an old school comedian who quotes Arkadi Raikin and wears winter clothing even during summer. He talks with a horrible rasp in his voice.

Viki (Viktro King) (Jan Uuspõld) is a television figure and a former classmate of Uuno Nisu. He is almost always drunk.

Feeliks Raudjalg (Dan Põldroos) is a molester who fakes that he is crippled. He pretends to be a proud Estonian freedom fighter, when he was really a spy for the KGB.

Mürka ja Mürka perse / Mürka and Ass of Mürka (Jan Uuspõld and Dan Põldroos) is the ass of renowned Estonian basketball star Martin Müürsepp. It tends to have a life of its own and sometimes escapes from its owner.

Inspektor Kukeke (Valdek Kukeke) (Dan Põldroos) is a corrupt, incompetent police. He gets his information on crimes from TV, because "newspapers are too expensive".

References

Estonian television shows
Estonian television series